In geometry, a pentakis dodecahedron or kisdodecahedron is the polyhedron created by attaching a pentagonal pyramid to each face of a regular dodecahedron; that is, it is the Kleetope of the dodecahedron. It is a Catalan solid, meaning that it is a dual of an Archimedean solid, in this case, the truncated icosahedron.

Cartesian coordinates

Let  be the golden ratio. Its dual regular dodecahedron, whose edges intersect those of the icosahedron at right angles, has as vertices the points  together with the points  and cyclic permutations of these coordinates. Multiplying all coordinates of the icosahedron by a factor of  gives a slightly smaller icosahedron. The 12 vertices of this icosahedron, together with the vertices of the dodecahedron, are the vertices of a pentakis dodecahedron centered at the origin. The length of its long edges equals . The length ratio between the long and short edges of these triangles equals .

Chemistry
The pentakis dodecahedron in a model of buckminsterfullerene: each surface segment represents a carbon atom.   Equivalently, a truncated icosahedron is a model of buckminsterfullerene, with each vertex representing a carbon atom.

Biology
The pentakis dodecahedron is also a model of some icosahedrally symmetric viruses, such as Adeno-associated virus.  These have 60 symmetry related capsid proteins, which combine to make the 60 symmetrical faces of a pentakis dodecahedron.

Orthogonal projections
The pentakis dodecahedron has three symmetry positions, two on vertices, and one on a midedge:

Concave pentakis dodecahedron 
A concave pentakis dodecahedron adds inverted pyramids on the pentagonal faces of a dodecahedron.
{| style="width: 100%;"
|- style="vertical-align: top;"
|

Related polyhedra

See also
 Excavated dodecahedron

Cultural references
The Spaceship Earth structure at Walt Disney World's Epcot is a derivative of a pentakis dodecahedron.
The model for a campus arts workshop designed by Jeffrey Lindsay was actually a hemispherical pentakis dodecahedron https://books.google.com/books?id=JD8EAAAAMBAJ&pg=PA92&dq=jeffrey+lindsay&hl=en&ei=oF88Tv25F7OisQLGwbwt&sa=X&oi=book_result&ct=result&redir_esc=y#v=onepage&q=jeffrey%20lindsay&f=false
The shape of the "Crystal Dome" used in the popular TV game show The Crystal Maze was based on a pentakis dodecahedron.
In Doctor Atomic, the shape of the first atomic bomb detonated in New Mexico was a pentakis dodecahedron.
In De Blob 2 in the Prison Zoo, domes are made up of parts of a Pentakis Dodecahedron. These Domes also appear whenever the player transforms on a dome in the Hypno Ray level.
Some Geodomes in which people play on are Pentakis Dodecahedra.

References

 (Section 3-9)

 (The thirteen semiregular convex polyhedra and their duals, Page 18, Pentakisdodecahedron)
The Symmetries of Things 2008, John H. Conway, Heidi Burgiel, Chaim Goodman-Strass,   (Chapter 21, Naming the Archimedean and Catalan polyhedra and tilings, page 284, Pentakis dodecahedron )

External links

Pentakis Dodecahedron – Interactive Polyhedron Model

Catalan solids
Geodesic polyhedra